The name Cindy has been used for eleven tropical cyclones worldwide.

Used nine times in the Atlantic Ocean:
 Hurricane Cindy (1959), caused minor damage to South Carolina
 Tropical Storm Cindy (1963), caused $12 million damage and three deaths in Texas and Louisiana
 Tropical Storm Cindy (1981), formed between Bermuda and Nova Scotia, remained in the open sea
 Tropical Storm Cindy (1987), stayed in the open sea
 Tropical Storm Cindy (1993), the tropical depression that became Cindy crossed Martinique, killing two; as a tropical storm, it made landfall on the Dominican Republic, killing two more
 Hurricane Cindy (1999), reached Category 4 but never threatened land
 Hurricane Cindy (2005), made landfall near Grand Isle, Louisiana, as a weak hurricane; moderate flooding and some tornado damage reported
 Tropical Storm Cindy (2011), formed northeast of Bermuda and moved out to sea
 Tropical Storm Cindy (2017), a large tropical storm that formed in the Gulf of Mexico and made landfall in southwest Louisiana; produced heavy rainfall and flooding

Used once in the Southwest Indian Ocean:
 Tropical Storm Cindy (1998), originally named Victor in the Australian region; renamed Cindy as it moved into the Southwest Indian Ocean

Used once in the Australian region:
 Cyclone Cindy (1970), short-lived storm in the Gulf of Carpentaria

Atlantic hurricane set index articles
Australian region cyclone set index articles
South-West Indian Ocean cyclone set index articles